Bad Boys (Music from the Motion Picture) is the soundtrack to the 1995 action-comedy film Bad Boys. It was released on March 21, 1995 through Sony Music Entertainment's sub-label Work Records. The album peaked at No. 26 on the Billboard 200 and No. 13 on the Top R&B/Hip-Hop Albums.

The charting singles were "Never Find Someone Like You" by Keith Martin which peaked at No. 42 on the Hot R&B/Hip-Hop Singles & Tracks, "Someone to Love" by Jon B. featuring Babyface which peaked at No. 10 on the Hot 100 and No. 7 on the Hot R&B/Hip-Hop Singles & Tracks and "Shy Guy" by Diana King which peaked at No. 13 on the Hot 100 and No. 21 on the Hot R&B/Hip-Hop Singles & Tracks.

The album was well received by fans of the rap/R&B genres but disappointed fans of Mark Mancina's movie score as only one of up to fifteen tracks composed for the film by Mancina was featured on the album. Also, most of the industrial rock tracks which featured primarily in the "Club Hell" scene are also missing from the album. These include "Nothing" by Stabbing Westward, "Angels" by Dink and "Sweet Little Lass" by DAG.

The original score by Mark Mancina was released in September 2007 by La-La Land Records as a limited edition of 3000 copies.

Track listing 
Soundtrack album

Notes
Track 12 is a bonus track, not in the motion picture

Score album

Track listing 
Original score composed by Mark Mancina. Additional music & Orchestra conducted by Nick Glennie-Smith.
 "Prologue – The Car Jacking" – 4:31
 "Bad Boys – Main Title/Heist" – 6:07
 "Funky Brothers To PD" – 0:34
 "Air Conditioning Inspection" – 1:07
 "JoJo, What You Know?" – 0:39
 "Dead Guy" – 4:55
 "He's the Person I'd Call" – 0:52
 "Killing Max" – 4:15
 "The Boys Find Max" – 2:29
 "Into Lois' Apartment" – 0:49
 "Escape from Julie's" – 2:46
 "You're Going to Leave Me Alone?" – 0:50
 "Don't Honey Me Baby!" – 1:01
 "My Bologna Has a First Name" – 4:02
 "Julie's Got a Gun" – 0:53
 "Escape from Club Hell/Ether Chase" – 4:33
 "We Don't Want To Lose You" – 0:38
 "I Mean Like Funny" – 2:00
 "Interrogation" – 0:40
 "Stake Out" – 0:53
 "Tailing Lab Tech/Blown Cover" – 1:35
 "Busted" – 0:51
 "Footchase" – 4:23
 "Fouchet Calling" – 0:32
 "Hangar Shootout" – 9:14
 "Cobra Chase/Fouchet's Death" – 4:40
 "Bad Boys – Main Title (Edited Film Version)" – 3:36 (Bonus Track)

Total time of the La-La Land Records limited release is 70:32.

Charts

Weekly charts

Year-end charts

Certifications

References

External links

1995 soundtrack albums
Hip hop soundtracks
Bad Boys (franchise)
Albums produced by DJ Muggs
Albums produced by Warren G
Albums produced by Mark Mancina
Albums produced by Danny Sembello
Albums produced by Jermaine Dupri
Albums produced by Sly and Robbie
Albums produced by Babyface (musician)
Albums produced by Soulshock and Karlin
Action film soundtracks
Comedy film soundtracks